Garcia Fernandes (died c. 1565) was a Portuguese Renaissance painter. Like many of painters of the time, Garcia Fernandes was a pupil in the Lisbon workshop of Jorge Afonso, who was the court painter of King Manuel I.

In the 1530s he worked in Coimbra for the monasteries of Santa Clara-a-Velha and of Santa Cruz. In 1533 and 1534, together with Cristóvão de Figueiredo and Gregório Lopes, he was responsible for the three painted altarpieces of the Monastery of Ferreirim, near Lamego. Later, he painted panels for the transept of the Church of St Francis in Évora.

In Lisbon, he was responsible for the altarpiece of the Trindade Convent and the panel for the St Bartholomew Chapel of Lisbon Cathedral (c. 1537), as well as a large oil painting, The Marriage of Saint Alexis (once known as The Marriage of King Manuel of Portugal) (1541), now in the Museum of São Roque. Fernandes even painted altarpieces commissioned for the cathedral of Old Goa, in Portuguese India, then a part of the Portuguese Empire.

Garcia Fernandes married in 1518 and had at least nine children. His paintings can be seen in several churches and monasteries around Portugal, as well as in the National Museum of Ancient Art (Lisbon) and the Machado de Castro Museum (Coimbra).

References

External links

Portuguese Renaissance painting (by Maria José Palla).
 Paintings by Garcia Fernandes (Six Centuries of Portuguese Painting website).

Portuguese male painters
Year of death unknown
1560s deaths
16th-century Portuguese painters
Portuguese Renaissance painters
Year of birth unknown

Catholic painters